Top Ryde City (previously known as Top Ryde Shopping Centre) is a large indoor/outdoor shopping centre owned by The Blackstone Group. It is located in the suburb of Ryde in Northern Sydney.

Transport 
Top Ryde has bus connections to the Sydney CBD, North Shore and Northern Suburbs, as well as local surrounding suburbs operated by Busways. Majority of its bus services are located in Devlin Road in front of the shopping centre's main entrance and Blaxland Road. There is no railway station at Ryde, the nearest stations are located at Meadowbank and West Ryde and a metro station at Macquarie Park.

History
The original Top Ryde Shopping Centre opened, on the current 3.5 hectare site on 14 November 1957 by then premier of New South Wales John Joseph Cahill. It was the first post-war major open-air shopping centre built in New South Wales and the second post war and open-air mall-type complex built in Australia after Brisbane's Chermside Drive-In Shopping Centre (now Westfield Chermside) . 

The centre was the dream of Peter Benjamin from the retailing family who opened A.J. Benjamin's in the suburb of Chatswood. Benjamin had travelled to the US in 1953 where he visited about 20 shopping centres in the new American style and met up with friend Peter Yeoman who was completing postgraduate studies in Detroit on the subject of American shopping centres. Together they devised a design for such a shopping centre in Sydney. Yeoman came up with the idea of the apricot brick and the windowless building with vertical divisions, while Benjamin sketched the layout for retailing.

Top Ryde was anchored by Sydney-based A.J. Benjamin & Co department store, Franklins supermarket, a chain variety store and 45 other shops grouped around a pedestrian mall, with 400 parking spaces. The centre feature modern sculpture centre which was a focal point designed by artist Gordon Andrews, a personal friend of Peter Yeoman. Top Ryde was established with the motto "come as you are...shop in comfort" offering a new experience for the shopper who until this time would have needed to travel to Sydney or Parramatta to gain access to a major department store and such a wide range of variety shopping.

In 1962, Top Ryde was sold to Lend Lease who undertook expansion of the centre. Woolworths was opened in 1963 in addition to the expansion of the centre which also included a variety store, several speciality shops and another 200 car parking spaces. The A.J. Benjamin store closed and was taken over by Grace Bros in 1964. As regional shopping centres became the focus of community activities and associated recreational activities a Ten Pin Bowling Alley opened in the 1970s known as BowlAustralia's WondABowl- Top Ryde which was rebranded in 2003 to AMF Bowling.

The centre underwent refurbishment and redevelopment in 1986 and changed its name to Top Ryde Shopping Square. A new multi-storey carpark was constructed, along with new entrances, roofing of the mall area and a general upgrade. Venture then moved into the space vacated by Grace Brothers.

Venture closed in 1991 and the centre went a minor development with the opening of a Target store and the re-organisation of the shops into service areas such as banking to the south-west of the mall and the food court which contained McDonald's on the lower concourse. 

With the opening of Macquarie Centre in 1981 and the continual growth of centres such as Westfield Hornsby, Westfield Parramatta, Birkenhead Point Outlet Centre and most recently the opening Rhodes Shopping Centre in 2004 has severely affected the retail trade of Top Ryde. The centre lost a lot of stores including Target which closed around 2005–2006.

Towards the end of the centre's life, it was almost a dead mall featuring Woolworths, Franklins, a bowling alley and around 90 stores which were predominantly banks and service stores. The centre was situated over 2 floors. The lower level had direct access to the bottom carpark level and featured Woolworths and a small food court. It was connected to the upper level via a travelator. The upper level contained Franklins and access to Blaxland Road and Devlin Street, as well as access to bus services. A smaller, third level which could be accessed via a staircase from the upper level and the rooftop carpark (originally the upper level of Grace Bros. and connected by elevators) featured the bowling alley. 

In July 2007, the centre was demolished, and shortly thereafter, construction began on redeveloping the site.

The new centre was renamed to Top Ryde City after it was a chosen name from City of Ryde Council.

Stage 1 was opened on 5 November 2009, consisting of around 115 stores including Woolworths, Big W, Dan Murphys & JB Hi-Fi. This is on the Tucker Street side of the development. Other stages progressively opened throughout 2010, each stage next to the previous moving progressively towards Pope Street.

Stage 2 was completed and opened in March 2010 and included the opening of Aldi, Rebel Sport and 60 speciality stores. This also saw the first section of La Strada (fashion precinct) opened.

Stage 3 was completed which consisted of the Myer department store and additional fashion outlets within the La Strada opened on 4 August 2010. 

Top Ryde City had its official opening on 20 August 2010 which was presided over by then Prime Minister Julia Gillard. 

The final works which included Event Cinemas, a childcare centre, medical centre, Gymnasium, The new Ryde Library and The Ryde Planning and Business Centre all opened in February 2011. There were plans for Strike Bowling to open in February 2011, but the plans were cancelled and the bowling alley never opened.

The southern pedestrian overpass opened in December 2009 and the northern pedestrian overpass was opened in August 2010.

The development of the project encountered a number of problems, including issues of worker safety in the surrounding roads
and a near fatal workplace accident. In addition to this, the local Chamber of Commerce raised some concerns with the project managers about the movement of trucks near the site, although these seem to have been dealt with by the project managers with the termination of contracts with trucking companies.

The original owners of Top Ryde City entered administration in 2011 (similar to a Chapter 11 bankruptcy) appointing McGrathNicol. The new owners of Top Ryde is now Blackstone Group which purchased the centre in November 2012.

In 2014 property developer Crown Group Holdings completed the final apartments in its 653-apartment development, Top Ryde City Living. The seven-tower residential complex is home to more than 600 residents and positioned above Top Ryde City Shopping Centre with views to the Sydney Harbour Bridge, Blue Mountains and North Shore.

The development was awarded the NSW President's award in 2014 by the Urban Development Institute of Australia (UDIA).

On 21 May 2018, Blackstone announced that Top Ryde City is for sale which is worth $700 million.

Recent development

On 5 May 2015, Myer has closed its Top Ryde store due to poor sales with many customers increasingly shopping at other Myer stores such as Parramatta, Chatswood, Macquarie Centre and Sydney. The redevelopment began in June 2015 which saw many stores closed or relocated during the redevelopment including Freedom Furniture and Supa IGA which have both closed. This development consists of
 A full line Kmart on the space previously occupied by Supa IGA (and Franklins prior to 2013) which opened on 16 June 2016
 A full line Coles supermarket including a liquor store on the first floor of the space vacated by Myer which opened on 9 November 2016
 A new fresh food precinct and new stores opened on 9 November 2016 
 Harris Scarfe opened their first full line Sydney store on 22 July 2017 on the ground floor of the former Myer. However, in January 2020 this store has permanently closed amongst the 20 other stores after Harris Scarfe has entered voluntary administration in December 2019. This store was replaced by Supreme Furniture which opened on 1 August 2020. This was then replaced by Timezone and Zone Bowling on 21 November 2021. 
 TK Maxx has also opened its store on the same date as Harris Scarfe.

Tenants
Top Ryde City has 78,125m² of floor space. The major retailers include Big W, Kmart, Aldi, Coles, Woolworths, TK Maxx, JB Hi-Fi, Rebel, Fitness First, Timezone and Event Cinemas.

References

External links
 Top Ryde City Official Website

Shopping centres in Sydney
Shopping malls established in 2009
2009 establishments in Australia
City of Ryde